Dillon Ray Overton (born August 17, 1991) is an American former professional baseball pitcher. He played in Major League Baseball (MLB) for the Oakland Athletics, Seattle Mariners, and San Diego Padres and in the Chinese Professional Baseball League (CPBL) for the Rakuten Monkeys.

Amateur career
Overton was drafted by the Boston Red Sox in the 26th round of the 2010 Major League Baseball draft out of Weatherford High School in Weatherford, Oklahoma. He did not sign with the Red Sox and played college baseball at the University of Oklahoma for the Sooners from 2011 to 2013.

Professional career

Oakland Athletics
Overton was then drafted by the Oakland Athletics in the second round of the 2013 Major League Baseball draft. After signing, Overton underwent Tommy John surgery, a development which significantly lowered his signing bonus. He returned in 2014 and made his professional debut with the Arizona League Athletics. He was later promoted to the Vermont Lake Monsters, where he finished the season. Unfortunately, the surgery did affect his fastball velocity, which dropped from mid-90s to high-80s. Overton split the 2015 season with the Class A-Advanced Stockton Ports and the Double-A Midland RockHounds. He began the 2016 season with an 8–4 record and 3.01 earned run average with the Triple-A Nashville Sounds, before being promoted to the Athletics to make his major league debut on June 25, becoming the 11th Athletic to make a start during 2016. Overton made 5 starts with Oakland in 2016, going 1–3 with an 11.47 ERA, giving up 12 HR in 24.1 innings pitched. Following the signing of infielder Adam Rosales, Overton was designated for assignment on January 25, 2017.

Seattle Mariners
On January 26, 2017, Overton was traded to the Seattle Mariners in exchange for minor-leaguer Jason Goldstein, adding to Seattle's starting pitching depth. Overton pitched to a 6.31 ERA for Seattle and was designated for assignment.

San Diego Padres
He was claimed off waivers on June 19 by the San Diego Padres. He was outrighted to AAA on August 31, 2017. He became a free agent following the 2019 season.

Arizona Diamondbacks
On March 11, 2020, Overton signed a minor league deal with the Arizona Diamondbacks. Overton was released by the Diamondbacks organization on May 22, 2020.

Rakuten Monkeys
On December 21, 2020, the Rakuten Monkeys of the Chinese Professional Baseball League signed Overton for the 2021 season. On March 16, 2021, Overton made his CPBL debut. Overton was released by Rakuten on September 25, 2021.

Colorado Rockies
On February 18, 2022, Overton signed a minor league contract with the Colorado Rockies. He retired on July 9, 2022.

Personal life
Overton and his wife, Morgan, have one son named Oliver Ray who was born in April 2017.

References

External links

Oklahoma Sooners bio

1991 births
Living people
People from Clinton, Oklahoma
Baseball players from Oklahoma
Major League Baseball pitchers
Oakland Athletics players
Seattle Mariners players
San Diego Padres players
Oklahoma Sooners baseball players
Arizona League Athletics players
Arizona League Padres players
Vermont Lake Monsters players
Stockton Ports players
Midland RockHounds players
San Antonio Missions players
Nashville Sounds players
Tacoma Rainiers players
El Paso Chihuahuas players
American expatriate baseball players in Taiwan
Rakuten Monkeys players